Peacock Island is the smallest of the four islands owned by Stratford, Connecticut (USA), in the Housatonic River between I-95 and the Merritt Parkway. The island is north of the Moses Wheeler Bridge, west of Carting Island, southwest of Long Island (Connecticut), Pope's Flat, and south of Fowler Island in Milford and the Igor I. Sikorsky Memorial Bridge. The island is uninhabited except for occasional visits by anglers, bird watchers and duck hunters.

Geography

Elevation: ~  
The mercury content was evaluated in 2003 at ~300 to 5,000 ppb.

Transportation
All transportation to and from the island is by boat.

Notes

External links

Stratford, Connecticut
Landforms of Fairfield County, Connecticut
River islands of Connecticut
Uninhabited islands of the United States